Natalie Laura Mering (born June 11, 1988), known professionally as Weyes Blood (pronounced ), is an American singer, songwriter, and musician. She was primarily raised in Doylestown, Pennsylvania. She has been performing her own material under variations of the name Weyes Blood since 2003.

Her music has undergone significant changes throughout her career. She has been involved in the underground noise music scene and was briefly bassist of the Portland, Oregon-based group Jackie-O Motherfucker and was the singer for the band Satanized. As Weyes Bluhd she made three self-released albums, changing to Weyes Blood to release The Outside Room (2011) on micro-label Not Not Fun Records. She then signed a recording contract with independent label Mexican Summer, releasing The Innocents (2014) and Front Row Seat to Earth (2016). She released her fourth studio album, Titanic Rising (2019) on Sub Pop, to critical acclaim. Her fifth studio album, And in the Darkness, Hearts Aglow, was released on Sub Pop on November 18, 2022.

Life and career

1988–2002: Early life
Natalie Laura Mering was born on June 11, 1988, in Santa Monica, California, into a deeply religious born again Pentecostal Christian family. Commenting on her upbringing, Mering said: "I was raised in a real spiritual, Bible Belt household. So I developed my own cynicism because there are always things in the Bible that really bum me out.... I became really obsessed with the Kids in the Hall as a kid, and they had Scott Thompson, who's like the one gay member. I remember having this feeling that 'Oh, Scott Thompson isn't going to heaven? How could that be?' That was my first big tipoff that something wasn't quite right with dogmatic Christianity. And then I was just trying to undo it at the age of 12."

Mering's family moved several times throughout her childhood; she spent her early life in Scotts Valley, California before they settled in Doylestown, Pennsylvania in 1999, where she attended high school. Both her older brothers and parents are musicians and music played an important part in her upbringing. Her father, Sumner Mering, is a musician and guitarist who was in the Los Angeles new wave band Sumner in the late 1970s.

2003–2014: Career beginnings and The Innocents

At the age of 15, Mering began using the moniker Wise Blood (a reference to the 1952 Flannery O'Connor novel) to write songs. She changed to Weyes Bluhd on several self-released records before changing the spelling to Weyes Blood. After finishing high school, Mering relocated to Portland, Oregon to attend Lewis & Clark College, where she majored in music and had a radio show on the campus radio station. However, Mering dropped out after her first year of studies. She subsequently began touring the underground music scene, performing as a bassist in the Portland-based band Jackie-O Motherfucker and playing keyboards and singing with noise rock band Satanized.

In 2011, she released her debut studio album The Outside Room as Weyes Blood and the Dark Juices on Not Not Fun Records. Uncut magazine described the album as ''devotional and ethereal, but with an edge", while Beatbots found it "an impressive and ambitious album". Mering released her second studio album in October 2014 called The Innocents, which was released through Mexican Summer. It was recorded in rural Pennsylvania, Mering's apartment and Gary's Electric Studio in Greenpoint, Brooklyn. It included contributions by Jacob Brunner (drums) and James Strong (bass). Mering described the theme of the album as being "about my first real relationship that went really awry."

2014–2021: Front Row Seat to Earth and Titanic Rising
After the album's release, Mering relocated from New York to Los Angeles, California. She commented: "I was in New York alone: no friends, no money, no record deal at the time. Literally I had nothing." In 2016, she released her third studio album Front Row Seat to Earth, on Mexican Summer to critical acclaim, and toured throughout Europe and the States. NPR wrote that the album reexamines "intimacy and idealism in ways that showcase Mering's gift for measuring and mediating heady emotions." Mering stated the songs on the album were largely inspired by the isolation she felt while living in New York.

On February 12, 2019, a new studio album titled Titanic Rising was announced and available to pre-order on her website, along with dates of her upcoming tour. The album was released by Sub Pop on April 5, 2019 to critical acclaim. Mering describes Titanic Rising as "The Kinks meet WWII or Bob Seger meets Enya." Other influences include Kate Bush and Karen Carpenter of the Carpenters. Titanic Rising is described as a record about romantic disappointment, damaged reality, and finding hope.

The record received high placements on year-end and decade-end lists from publications such as Pitchfork, Uproxx, Paste, Uncut, Dazed, The Guardian, and NPR. On July 16, 2019, she had her TV debut on Late Night with Seth Meyers, where she performed her single "Everyday" from Titanic Rising. Live performance highlights include sold-out tours in the US and Europe, as well as opening for Kacey Musgraves in the fall of 2019 and singing with Lana Del Rey at the Hollywood Bowl.

Mering was heavily involved in the 2020 Tim Heidecker concept album Fear of Death, singing on all twelve tracks, co-writing two and receiving a co-producer credit. She received wider attention when she featured (along with Zella Day) on the closing track of the 2021 Lana Del Rey studio album Chemtrails over the Country Club, a cover of the Joni Mitchell song "For Free".

On October 29, 2020, she helped canvass for the Democratic Socialists of America.

2022–present: And in the Darkness, Hearts Aglow
On September 12, 2022, Mering announced her fifth studio album And in the Darkness, Hearts Aglow would be released on November 18, 2022, and released its lead single "It's Not Just Me, It's Everybody" the same day. In promotion of the album she will embark on the In Holy Flux Tour across North America and Europe in 2023. The second single, "Grapevine", followed on October 11, 2022. Upon its release, the album received critical acclaim, aggregating a weighted average score of 88 on Metacritic based on 24 critic reviews.

Musical style and influences
Mering's musical style has been labelled as chamber pop, psychedelic folk, soft rock, noise and experimental rock.

Mering has stated that church music, which figured prominently in her upbringing, has been an influence on her songwriting. "Most of the great classical music and early music of our time is written for God in a sacred space," she said. "So sacred music and sacred space music — that was my favorite thing about music. Not so much content-wise. Not so much the theory and concept of God, but just the idea that we've built this gigantic, stone cathedral palace for people to sing in...When I record, I think about sacred space and I think about what would be the sound of your soul if there is music coming out of it. It would probably be an echoey, strange chamber." In an interview with Nardwuar in 2019 she revealed that she is also influenced by the Velvet Underground, Wolf Eyes, and experimental artist Inca Ore. Mering states in the same interview that early in her career while making experimental music, people likened her songs to horror film soundtracks, so she began to listen to and be influenced by film soundtracks such as Jaws (1975) and The Wizard of Oz (1939).

Mering is also highly influenced by the late singer-songwriter Harry Nilsson, in both singing style and songwriting.

Discography

Studio albums

Extended plays

Singles

Music videos

Guest appearances

Awards and nominations

Notes

References

External links

 Official website
 
 Weyes Blood at Bandcamp
 
 
 Weyes Blood on YouTube

1988 births
American contraltos
Living people
Lewis & Clark College alumni
Mexican Summer artists
Musicians from the San Francisco Bay Area
Musicians from Santa Monica, California
Musicians from Portland, Oregon
People from Doylestown, Pennsylvania
Singers from Los Angeles
Singers from Oregon
Singers from Pennsylvania
21st-century American women
Feminist musicians
Jackie-O Motherfucker members